The Vagrant is a 2002 Chinese drama. It was produced by Mediacorp, a television station in Singapore. The cast includes veteran actors Li Nanxing, Huang Biren and Huang Yiliang as well as new artistes Zhang Yaodong, Le Yao and Zzen Zhang. The Vagrant was the second highest rated drama serial in 2002, after Beautiful Connection which coincidentally also starred Huang Bi Ren.

Story
The first episode begins with the introduction of Ah Bao, who narrates his story. Abandoned by his own parents as a child, Ah Bao (Li Nanxing) grew up with gangsters and often got into trouble. At the age of 21, Ah Bao went to jail after his friend (Zheng Geping) and girlfriend (Joey Swee) betrayed him during a robbery he took part in. While in jail, Ah Bao plotted his revenge against the people who betrayed him.

Upon his release from prison, he discovered that his friend is now intellectually disabled and that his friend's ex-girlfriend has remarried. He learns that the couple has left behind children, who are abused by their foster family. Feeling sorry for them, Ah Bao decides to take care of the children.

Ah Bao ends up renting a place from Shushu (Huang Biren), a chicken rice seller, who is infamous for her weird temper. Living under the same roof, Ah Bao learns that Shushu's temperament is due to her husband's (Huang Yiliang) betrayal when she had breast cancer. As time goes by, the couple discovers the nicer side of each other and Ah Bao learns about trust again.

Just when life seems to be turning better for Ah Bao, he discovers the truth about his downfall ten years ago. He decides to uncover the mastermind. Is Ah Bao taking a wrong step in his life again?

Cast

Main cast
Li Nanxing as Ah Bao/ Liu Xiaoming
Huang Biren as Gan Shushu

Supporting cast
Zheng Geping as Ah Lang
Huang Yiliang as Huang Jinlang
Huang Shinan as Du Wei (David)
Joey Swee as Cecilia
Ang Ching Hui as Ke-ai
Fraser Tiong as Kele
Tracer Wong as Mao Nana
Yao Wenlong as Lin Dehua 
Zhang Yaodong as Gan Yuan
Le Yao as Yang Xiaomin
Yvonne Lim as Song Xintian
Zen Chong as Zhang Disheng
Li Wenhai

2002 Accolades

References

External links
Theme song
The Vagrant (Chinese)

Singapore Chinese dramas
2002 Singaporean television series debuts
2002 Singaporean television series endings
Channel 8 (Singapore) original programming